Talbot Smith (October 11, 1899 – December 21, 1978) was a United States district judge of the United States District Court for the Eastern District of Michigan.

Education and career

Born in Fayette, Missouri, Smith received a Bachelor of Science degree from the United States Naval Academy in 1920. He received a Master of Science from the Naval Postgraduate School in 1928. He received a Juris Doctor from University of Michigan Law School in 1934. He was in the United States Navy as a Lieutenant from 1917 to 1931. He was an engineer with the Atlantic Refining Company in 1931. He was in private practice of law in Detroit, Michigan from 1934 to 1937. He was a professor of law at the University of Missouri from 1937 to 1941. He was an attorney with the Office of Price Administration from 1941 to 1944. He was in private practice in Ann Arbor, Michigan from 1944 to 1945. He was a professor at the University of California, Berkeley from 1945 to 1946. He was in private practice in Ann Arbor from 1947 to 1955. He was an associate justice of the Supreme Court of Michigan from 1955 to 1961.

Federal judicial service

Smith received a recess appointment from President John F. Kennedy on October 5, 1961, to the United States District Court for the Eastern District of Michigan, to a new seat created by 75 Stat. 80. He was nominated to the same seat by President Kennedy on January 15, 1962. He was confirmed by the United States Senate on February 5, 1962, and received his commission on February 9, 1962. He assumed senior status on October 31, 1971. His service was terminated on December 21, 1978, due to his death.

References

Sources
 

1899 births
1978 deaths
Judges of the United States District Court for the Eastern District of Michigan
United States district court judges appointed by John F. Kennedy
20th-century American judges
United States Naval Academy alumni
University of Michigan Law School alumni
United States Navy officers
People from Fayette, Missouri
Military personnel from Missouri
Justices of the Michigan Supreme Court